"Will I?" is a song by Belgian music project Ian Van Dahl (now known as AnnaGrace). The single was released on 10 December 2001 as the second single from their debut album, Ace (2002). It peaked within the top 10 of the charts in the United Kingdom and Denmark. In Australia, the song originally charted at number 70 in February 2002, but when it was re-released as a double A-side with "Reason" later in the year, it peaked at number 29 on the ARIA Singles Chart.

Track listings

Belgian and Dutch CD single
 "Will I?" (radio edit) – 3:39
 "Will I?" (Dee Dee radio edit) – 3:50

Dutch maxi-CD single
 "Will I?" (radio edit) – 3:39
 "Will I?" (extended mix) – 6:30
 "Will I?" (Dee Dee extended mix) – 7:31
 "Will I?" (Peter Luts remix) – 7:59
 "Will I?" (Pulsedriver remix) – 7:49

Scandinavian CD single
 "Will I?" (radio edit) – 3:40
 "Will I?" (extended mix) – 5:09

UK CD and cassette single
 "Will I?" (radio edit) – 2:38
 "Will I?" (Hemstock and Jennings remix) – 7:22
 "Castles in the Sky" (Loverush Ltd. remix) – 8:22

UK 12-inch single
A1. "Will I?" (club mix) – 6:25
B1. "Will I?" (Lange remix) – 7:01
B2. "Castles in the Sky" (Loverush Ltd. remix) – 6:30

US 12-inch single
A1. "Will I?" (extended mix) – 6:25
A2. "Will I?" (Dee Dee remix) – 7:28
B1. "Will I?" (Hemstock and Jennings remix) – 7:24
B2. "Will I?" (Lange remix) – 7:00

Australian CD single
 "Will I?" (radio edit)
 "Will I?" (Dee Dee radio edit)
 "Will I?" (extended mix)
 "Will I?" (Lange remix)
 "Will I?" (Peter Luts remix)
 "Will I?" (Coast to Coast remix)
 "Will I?" (Pulsedriver remix) – 7:49

Australian CD single ("Reason" / "Will I?")
 "Reason" (album edit) – 3:21
 "Will I?" (radio edit) – 3:39
 "Reason" (extended mix) – 5:51
 "Will I?" (VooDoo & Serano remix) – 6:24
 "Reason" (Lange remix) – 5:31

Charts

Weekly charts

Year-end charts

References

2001 songs
2001 singles
AnnaGrace songs
NuLife singles